Kapaklı is a district  of Tekirdağ Province, Turkey. The population of Kapaklı is 60877 as of 2011. The town is quite populated because of its vicinity to industrial sites and Istanbul.

References

External links

 Tekirdağ governor's official website
 Kapaklı Haber Sitesi - Official website

Populated places in Tekirdağ Province
Towns in Turkey
Districts of Tekirdağ Province